Karl Heide (born 3 November 1906, date of death unknown) was a German racing cyclist. He rode in the 1935 Tour de France.

References

External links
 

1906 births
Year of death missing
German male cyclists
Place of birth missing
Sportspeople from Hanover
Cyclists from Lower Saxony